Players and pairs who neither have high enough rankings nor receive wild cards may participate in a qualifying tournament held one week before the annual Wimbledon Tennis Championships.

Seeds

  Janet Lee (qualifying competition, lucky loser)
  Zsófia Gubacsi (first round)
  Wynne Prakusya (qualified)
  Seda Noorlander (first round)
  Anca Barna (qualified)
  Alina Jidkova (qualifying competition)
  Alena Vašková (first round)
  Anikó Kapros (second round)
  Miriam Schnitzer (qualified)
  Kristie Boogert (qualified)
  Gréta Arn (first round)
  Sandra Načuk (first round)
  Saori Obata (qualifying competition)
  Els Callens (first round)
  Katarina Srebotnik (first round)
  Klára Koukalová (second round)
  Maja Palaveršić (first round)
  Lenka Němečková (first round)
  Patricia Wartusch (first round)
  Adriana Serra Zanetti (qualified)
  Nadejda Ostrovskaya (first round)
  Yuka Yoshida (qualifying competition)
  Rika Fujiwara (first round)
  Laurence Courtois (second round)

Qualifiers

  Stéphanie Foretz
  Adriana Serra Zanetti
  Wynne Prakusya
  Eleni Daniilidou
  Anca Barna
  Karen Cross
  Clarisa Fernández
  Maureen Drake
  Miriam Schnitzer
  Kristie Boogert
  Barbara Schwartz
  Maja Matevžič

Lucky loser
  Janet Lee

Qualifying draw

First qualifier

Second qualifier

Third qualifier

Fourth qualifier

Fifth qualifier

Sixth qualifier

Seventh qualifier

Eighth qualifier

Ninth qualifier

Tenth qualifier

Eleventh qualifier

Twelfth qualifier

External links

2001 Wimbledon Championships on WTAtennis.com
2001 Wimbledon Championships – Women's draws and results at the International Tennis Federation

Women's Singles Qualifying
Wimbledon Championship by year – Women's singles qualifying
Wimbledon Championships